John V. McCarthy (c. 1932 – May 24, 1987) was a member of the Ohio House of Representatives. While in office, he was the sponsor of a bill proposing the establishment of medical schools at three Ohio universities. He left office in 1972 in order to run for election for treasurer of Mahoning County, Ohio, but did not win the election.

References

Democratic Party members of the Ohio House of Representatives
1930s births
1987 deaths
20th-century American politicians